Jaime Celestino Dias Bragança (born 9 June 1983 in Lisbon) is a Portuguese retired professional footballer who played as a winger.

In June 2016, Jaime Bragança announced his retirement and became a football agent.

References

External links

1983 births
Living people
Footballers from Lisbon
Portuguese footballers
Association football midfielders
Primeira Liga players
Liga Portugal 2 players
Segunda Divisão players
C.S. Marítimo players
C.D. Santa Clara players
S.C. Olhanense players
Gondomar S.C. players
2. Bundesliga players
FC Ingolstadt 04 players
First Professional Football League (Bulgaria) players
PFC Chernomorets Burgas players
Liga 1 (Indonesia) players
Liga I players
FC Vaslui players
ACF Gloria Bistrița players
CSM Corona Brașov footballers
Jaime Braganca
Jaime Braganca
Campeonato Brasileiro Série B players
Vila Nova Futebol Clube players
Malaysia Super League players
Portuguese expatriate footballers
Expatriate footballers in Bahrain
Expatriate footballers in Germany
Expatriate footballers in Kuwait
Expatriate footballers in Bulgaria
Expatriate footballers in Indonesia
Expatriate footballers in Romania
Expatriate footballers in Thailand
Expatriate footballers in Brazil
Expatriate footballers in Malaysia
Portuguese expatriate sportspeople in Bulgaria
Portuguese expatriate sportspeople in Indonesia
Portuguese expatriate sportspeople in Romania
Portuguese expatriate sportspeople in Thailand
Al-Sahel SC (Kuwait) players
Portuguese expatriate sportspeople in Kuwait
Portuguese expatriate sportspeople in Bahrain
Portuguese expatriate sportspeople in Malaysia
Portuguese expatriate sportspeople in Brazil
Portuguese expatriate sportspeople in Germany